Cum multa, "With many", is an encyclical issued by Pope Leo XIII on December 8, 1882, in which he gives some instructions to Spanish Catholics. It is composed of 20 points which deals with several aspects:

(1-2) Introduction.
(3-5) The Necessity of Union Amongst Catholics.
(6-9) The Relations Between Religion and Politics.
(10-11) The Authority of Bishops and the Respect Due to Them.
(12-13) The Clergy and Political Parties.
(14) Rules Which Should Guide Catholic Associations.
(15) And for the Conduct of the Catholic Press.
(16-20) End.

See also
 List of encyclicals of Pope Leo XIII

Notes

External links
 vatican.va Cum multa Full text

Encyclicals of Pope Leo XIII
1882 documents
1882 in Christianity
December 1882 events
History of Catholicism in Spain